Robert Eugene Argo (November 18, 1923 – July 7, 2016) was an American politician in the state of Georgia. He was an alumnus of the University of Georgia and was an insurance executive. Argo served in the Civil Air Patrol and then served in the United States Coast Guard during World War II. Argo He served in the Georgia House of Representatives from 1977 to 1986.

He was the father of Marty Kemp, first lady of Georgia.

References

1923 births
2016 deaths
People from Fulton County, Georgia
People of the Civil Air Patrol
Military personnel from Georgia (U.S. state)
Democratic Party members of the Georgia House of Representatives
University of Georgia alumni